{ "type": "ExternalData", "service": "geoshape", "ids": "Q1879040", "properties": { "fill": "#73a3f0"}}

Lyttelton Harbour / Whakaraupō is one of two major inlets in Banks Peninsula, on the coast of Canterbury, New Zealand; the other is Akaroa Harbour on the southern coast. The harbour sits in an eroded caldera of the ancient Banks Peninsula Volcano, the steep sides of which form the Port Hills on its northern shore.

The harbour's main population centre is Lyttelton, which serves the main port to the nearby city of Christchurch, linked with Christchurch by the single-track Lyttelton rail tunnel (opened 1867), a two lane road tunnel (opened 1964) and two roads over the Port Hills. Diamond Harbour lies to the south and the Māori village of Rāpaki to the west. At the head of the harbour is the settlement of Governors Bay. The reserve of Otamahua / Quail Island is near the harbour head and Ripapa Island is just off its south shore at the entrance to Purau Bay.

The harbour provides access to a busy commercial port at Lyttelton which today includes a petroleum storage facility and a modern container and cargo terminal.

Hector's dolphins, a species endemic to New Zealand, and New Zealand fur seals live in the harbour.

Name
Lyttelton Harbour / Whakaraupō is one of many places in New Zealand to have a dual place name, consisting of names derived from both European and Māori names for the area. The harbour was one of approximately 90 places to be given a dual name as part of a landmark Treaty of Waitangi settlement with the Ngāi Tahu iwi in 1998. Earlier sources give the Māori name as Whangaraupo, which has identical meaning to Whakaraupō, but uses the wider Māori spelling of the word for harbour. Captain Stokes of HMS Acheron, who led a survey of the harbour and surrounding lands in 1849, preferred to use the name Wakaraupo Bay to the then current English name of Port Cooper. However, Stokes' preferred name was not used when the harbour was officially renamed Port Victoria upon it becoming a Port of Entry in August 1849. The New Zealand Pilot of 1875, which is based on Stokes' survey, gives the Māori place name as Tewhaka, translating simply as 'the harbour'.

The harbour was given many different names during the early days of European settlement, the first of which was Cook's Harbour after early exploration by James Cook. This same expedition named Akaroa Harbour as Banks's Harbour after Joseph Banks. The first widespread name for the harbour was Port Cooper, after Daniel Cooper. This name was in common usage by the mid-1840s and was used as a brand name for farm produce from Banks Peninsula and the Dean's farm on the Canterbury Plains. The name Port Cooper was officially changed to Port Victoria (after Queen Victoria) in 1849, when the harbour became a Port of Entry. Both the 1849 Admiralty chart of the harbour and 1875 sailing instructions in the New Zealand Pilot refer to the harbour as Port Lyttelton or Victoria, with the latter source noting Port Cooper as a former name. Despite the name change and the use of Port Victoria on maps from the Canterbury Association, Port Cooper continued to see use as a name for some time. Charlotte Godley still refers to Port Cooper in her 1850 letters, while an 1867 immigrant also used the name when publishing his memoirs in 1928.

In 1858, the harbour's name changed again, this time to Lyttelton Harbour. This coincided with the naming of the town of Lyttelton on the harbour's north shore in honour of George William Lyttelton and the Lyttelton family. Exactly when the harbour came to be known as Lyttelton Harbour is unclear, as the name appears to have been in use for almost a decade prior to the name change. The name appears in an 1849 admiralty chart, while in 1853 John Robert Godley is reported using this name in a speech to the Canterbury Association. In the early 1860s, The Canterbury Provincial Council established a Lyttelton Harbour Commission, and in 1877 the Lyttelton Harbour Board came into existence, after the Provinces were abolished. This name was used until the adoption of the dual name in 1998.

History

Whakaraupō and the surrounding hills have a long history of Māori activity. The islands of Aua and Ōtamahua (now with the dual names of Aua / King Billy Island and Ōtamahua / Quail Island respectively) were important sources of resources for local Māori, despite being uninhabited. Ngāi Tahu and Ngāti Mamoe used the islands as a source of shellfish, birds eggs and flax, as well as stone for use in tools. Sandstone from Aua was used to help work other stones used by Māori, such as pounamu. The significance of Ōtamahua in this regard is recognised in its Māori name, which translates as the gathering place of eggs. The nearby Ripapa Island has evidence of more permanent habitation, and was the location of a prominent defensive Pā built by the Ngāi Tahu chief Taununu. The pā was attacked during the 1820s by another group of Ngāi Tahu consisting of various hapū from across the South Island as part of the Kai huanga feud. Despite being razed by the attacking forces, the pā was rebuilt and continued to be inhabited by Ngāi Tahu after this period until it was attacked by Te Rauparaha during his invasion of Canterbury. The pā remained uninhabited from this point, until it was removed when Fort Jervois was built on the island in 1885–95. Rīpapa was used in World War I to intern German nationals as enemy aliens, the most notable being Count Felix von Luckner.

Upon the initial settlement of Canterbury, the harbour became a centre of activity for the early European settlers owing to its easier access when compared to the swamplands in present-day Christchurch. Lyttelton's population grew quickly, with the surrounding land and Quail Island being initially converted into farmland. As immigration grew, Quail Island was offered as a quarantine station to provide facilities for inbound ships with illness on board. Facilities were completed and operational on the island by 1875, and continued to be used for quarantine of inbound humans and livestock until 1929. The island was also used for containing cases during the 1918 Spanish flu pandemic and later as a leper colony in 1918–25. Otamahua / Quail Island is now a nature reserve.

The growing population of Lyttelton and the harbour's position as the arrival port for many new settlers facilitated the development of new links to the wider island. The first of these links was the Bridle Path, completed in 1850 to coincide with the arrival of Canterbury Association ships. This was joined in 1858 by the completion of a road to Sumner over Evans Pass, and in 1867 by the opening of the Lyttelton Rail Tunnel. In 1877 the Lyttelton Harbour Board (now Lyttelton Port Company) started building an inner harbour, and in 1895 the Union Steamship Company of New Zealand started a steamship service on the  route between here and Wellington. From 1907 it was worked with turbine steamships and from 1933 it was named the "Steamer Express".

However, in 1962 New Zealand Railways started the Interislander ferry service on the  route between Picton and Wellington. This competing service not only offered a shorter crossing but also used diesel ships that had lower running costs than the Union Company's turbine steamers. The wreck of the Steamer Express  in 1968 was a setback for the Lyttelton service but the Union Company introduced a new ship, in 1972. She lost money, survived on a Ministry of Transport subsidy from 1974 and was withdrawn in 1976, leaving the Interislander's Picton route to continue the ferry link between the two islands.

Geography
Lyttelton Harbour / Whakaraupō was formed by erosion of the Banks Peninsula Volcano, which was active during the late Miocene from eruptive centres in both Lyttelton and Akaroa harbours. As the volcano eroded, the calderas formed by the eruptions were flooded, forming both of the main harbours on the Peninsula. The bottom of mostly soft mud and the only significant navigation hazard between the heads and the port is Parson Rock, a detached submerged rock pinnacle, which is marked, on the south side of the harbour about 200 metres north of Ripapa Island. The shipping channel has been dredged so the port can cope with larger container ships.

The prevailing winds in Lyttelton Harbour are from the north-east and south-west. South-west gales can be very violent and have been known to drive ships at anchor ashore from as early as 1851. In strong northerly winds a heavy swell rolls up the harbour.

Bays and headlands
Working around the harbour from Awaroa / Godley Head to Te Piaka / Adderley Head one encounters:
Mechanics Bay  Mechanics Bay is where supplies for the Godley Head lighthouse were landed.
Breeze Bay 
Livingstone Bay  
Otokitoki / Gollans Bay  This bay is below Evans Pass. Gollan was one of the surveyors of the harbour.
Battery Point  
Polhill's Bay  Which has been completely reclaimed for Cashin Quay.
Sticking Point  This is where construction of the Sumner Road stopped when it encountered difficult rock. 
Officers Point 
Erskine Bay  The Port of Lyttelton occupies this bay.
Tapoa / Erskine Point 
Magazine Bay 
Motukauatiiti / Corsair Bay  A popular bay for swimming at.
Motukauatirahi / Cass Bay  Thomas Cass was one of the surveyors of the harbour.
Rāpaki Bay 
Governors Bay 
Kaitangata / Mansons Peninsula  
Head of the Bay 
Moepuku Point  
Te Wharau / Charteris Bay 
Hays Bay  
Kaioruru / Church Bay 
Pauaohinekotau Head 
Te Waipapa / Diamond Harbour  
Stoddard Point 
Purau Bay 
Inainatua / Pile Bay  
Deep Gully Bay
Te Pohue / Camp Bay  
Waitata / Little Port Cooper  Formerly a whaling station and later a pilot station.

Islands
Aua / King Billy Island  Aua / King Billy Island is a small island between Otamahua / Quail Island and the adjacent headland of Moepuku Point. In the past it has also been called Little Quail Island.
Ōtamahua / Quail Island The Māori name  means eggs of the sea fowl. It was named Quail Island after an 1842 incident when Captain William Mein Smith flushed some native quail while out walking here to complete a sketch he was drawing of the island. Both the English and Māori names were given equal status in 2003 with the dual name of Ōtamahua / Quail Island.
Kamautaurua Island  Kamautaurua Island was previously known as Kamautaurua or Shag Reef. In December 1862, the cutter Dolphin capsized and wrecked on the reef into an unfavourable wind and tide when returning from further up the harbour with a load of lime. 
Ripapa Island  Also known as Ripa Island. The rock has been known by this name since the 1800s.

In popular culture 
Paul Theroux described Lyttelton Harbour as "long and lovely, a safe anchorage" in The Happy Isles of Oceania.

References

Further reading

External links

Ports and harbours of New Zealand
Geography of Canterbury, New Zealand
Landforms of Canterbury, New Zealand
Volcanoes of New Zealand
Miocene volcanoes
Extinct volcanoes
Calderas of New Zealand
Submarine calderas
Cook Strait Ferry
English-New Zealand culture
German-New Zealand culture